Boothen is an area and electoral ward of Stoke-on-Trent, Staffordshire, England.

References

Villages in Staffordshire